Bobone may refer to:

People 
Romano Bobone, Italian Roman Catholic cardinal appointed in 928 by Pope Leo VI
Saint Bobo (died 986), Frankish warrior and pilgrim from Noyers, also known as Bobone in Italian
Bobo of San Teodoro (died 1199), Italian Roman Catholic cardinal, known as Bobone in Italian, a elative of Pope Celestine III
Giacinto Bobone Orsini, Italian cardinal and later Pope Celestine III (1191-1198)
Jorge Bobone (1901–1958), Argentine astronomer
Bruno Bobone (born 1960), Portuguese businessman

Other uses 
Bobone (crater), lunar crater named after the astronomer